Hairy lobster is an imprecise term which could refer to either of the two taxa:

Furry lobsters of the family Synaxidae
Kiwa hirsuta of the family Kiwaidae

Animal common name disambiguation pages